Chardown Hill is a prominent, rounded hill,  high, just to the southwest of the village of Morcombelake in the county of Dorset in southern England. It overlooks the Dorset coast around 1½ kilometres to the south. Its prominence of  means it is listed as one of the Tumps. It is located within the South Dorset Downs.

The summit area is open and crossed by a bridleway running roughly north to south. Just south of the actual summit it is joined by a public footpath approaching from Stonebarrow Hill, the western spur of Chardown. The South West Coast Path passed along the foot of Chardown Hill and above the coastal cliffs.

References 

Hills of Dorset